Spodnje Hoče is a settlement in and the administrative centre of the Municipality of Hoče–Slivnica in northeastern Slovenia. It lies below the eastern Pohorje Hills on the edge of the flatlands on the right bank of the Drava River south of Maribor. The area is part of the traditional region of Styria. The municipality is now included in the Drava Statistical Region.

Name
The name Spodnje Hoče literally means 'lower Hoče', contrasting with neighboring Zgornje Hoče (literally, 'upper Hoče'). The name was attested in 1146 as de Choz (and as de Chotsse in 1181 and de Chosse in 1214). The name is originally a plural demonym (*Xoťane) derived from the nickname *Xotъ (based on a longer name such as *Xotimirъ).

Church

The local parish church is dedicated to Saint George and belongs to the Roman Catholic Archdiocese of Maribor. It was first mentioned in written documents dating to 1146, but the current building dates to the 15th century.

References

External links

Spodnje Hoče on Geopedia

Populated places in the Municipality of Hoče-Slivnica